Jesse Andrew Penn II (born September 6, 1962) is a former American football linebacker in the National Football League (NFL) for the Dallas Cowboys. He was selected by the Dallas Cowboys in the second round of the 1985 NFL Draft. He played college football at Virginia Tech.

Early years
Penn attended Martinsville High School, where he practiced football and track. He accepted a football scholarship from Virginia Tech. 

As a junior, he was named a starter at standup defensive end, becoming one of the leaders on defense, while playing on the same defensive line as future hall of famer Bruce Smith. He posted 70 tackles (fourth on the team), 39 solo tackles, 3 tackles for loss, 3 sacks, 3 interceptions, 9 passes defensed.

As a senior, he registered 65 tackles (fifth on the team), 35 solo tackles, 5 tackles for loss, 2 sacks, 5 interceptions (second on the team), 8 passes defensed (second on the team) and 2 fumble recoveries. He also participated in the Blue–Gray Football Classic. His 8 career interceptions were a school record for defensive linemen.

Professional career
Penn was selected by the Dallas Cowboys in the second round (44th overall) of the 1985 NFL Draft, to play as an outside linebacker. He also was selected fifth overall in the 1985 USFL Draft. As a rookie, he was a backup behind Jeff Rohrer. In the preseason against the Green Bay Packers, he returned an interception for a 77-yard touchdown. He started against the Cincinnati Bengals in place of an injured Rohrer, making 5 tackles and returned a blocked punt 49 yards for a touchdown. 

In 1987, he started in place of an injured Rohrer against the Detroit Lions, tallying 6 tackles, one forced fumble and 2 fumble recoveries. He finished the season with 2.5 sacks.

In the 1988 offseason he was diagnosed with a degenerative spinal condition, that forced him to retire.

References

1962 births
Living people
American football linebackers
Dallas Cowboys players
Virginia Tech Hokies football players
People from Martinsville, Virginia
Players of American football from Virginia
Martinsville High School (Virginia) alumni